Richard Thorpe was an American film director.

Richard Thorpe may also refer to:

 Jerry Thorpe (Richard Jerome Thorpe), son of the film director, American television and film director and producer
 Richard Thorpe (rugby union), rugby union player
 Richard Thorpe (priest), Anglican priest
 D. R. Thorpe, known as Richard, historian and biographer
 Ric Thorpe (Richard Charles Thorpe), British Church of England bishop

See also
 Rick Thorpe, Canadian politician
 Richard Thorp, English actor